The Cordillera People's Liberation Army (CPLA) was a militant organization based in the Cordillera region in the Philippines founded by Conrado Balweg.

Formation 
In 1986, the CPLA broke away from the communist New People's Army (NPA), criticizing the latter for its incompetence in pursuing its goals. 

The formation of the CPLA also saw the merger of the Tingguian Liberation Force, a splinter group from NPA Abra to form the Cordillera organization. Their goal was to fight for the self-determination of the people of Cordillera.

Mount Data Peace Accord 

In September 13, 1986, the CPLA and the Government of the Philippines made a "sipat" (ceasefire) at Mt. Data Hotel, in Bauko, Mountain Province. The agreement between the two entities was called the 1986 Mount Data Peace Accord.

Assassination of Conrado Balweg 

In 1999, the organization's founder, Conrado Balweg, was assassinated by the NPA.

2011 closure agreement 
A closure agreement between the CPLA and the Government of the Philippines was signed on July 4, 2011, at the Rizal Hall in Malacañang Palace. The agreement called for the disarmament of the group, the reintegration of the militants into mainstream society and the conversion of the militant group into a socio-economic organization.

Recent history 

While the group has stopped armed confrontation, the CPLA remains extant as of 2013, and still campaigns for greater autonomy in the Cordilleras with about 1,000 members.

Several persons had claimed to be the legal representatives of CPLA and has tarnished the image of the group. In 2016, a man named Conrado Dieza misrepresented himself as the Cordillera People’s Liberation Army (CPLA) chair, and Nilo Tayag, purportedly an Aglipayan bishop, used the name of CPLA  in soliciting cash, deceiving fellow Filipinos into shelling out a certain amount of money in exchange for government positions and projects, and claiming they have the ears of President Duterte and all senior government officials. Dieza and Tayag misleadingly announced that Environment Secretary Gina Lopez will provide P300 million to the CPLA and DFF, and that they will be appointed to key positions in the Department of Environment and Natural Resources. This is after also announcing that they will be named chair and general manager of the Philippine Charity Sweepstakes Office. However, this contention was defended by the party of Dieza and Tayag. Several factions were also allegedly created to conform with the programs of the Philippine National Government. In 2018, the Cordillera Peoples Liberation Army (CPLA) faction led by Conrado Dieza, Mailed Molina, and Jude Wal was supposed to hold a Regional Federalism Summit at the capitol gym but the DILG Provincial Director, Mayer Adong, said that his office did not recognize the summit as a legitimate activity of the CPLA. Governor Jocel Baac of Kalinga issued then a statement saying that the growing presence of the said CPLA group poses a problem to the peace and order situation in Kalinga and was counterproductive to the campaign for Cordillera autonomy and Federalism. 

Numerous leftist groups led by Cordillera People's Alliance accused the CPLA of being backed by the Philippine government after its "sipat" in 1986, citing its integration into the Armed Forces of the Philippines and alleged human rights atrocities while being used by the government for its counter-insurgency program.

References

Military units and formations established in 1986
Military history of the Philippines
Rebel groups in the Philippines
Advocacy groups in the Philippines
Communist armed conflicts in the Philippines